Lawson Island is one of the many uninhabited Canadian arctic islands in Qikiqtaaluk Region, Nunavut. It is located at the confluence of Hudson Strait and the Labrador Sea.

The island, a member of the Button Islands, is situated in the northeast part of the grouping, south-southwest of Lacy Island. It is the largest of the Button Islands. Other islands in the immediate vicinity include Holdridge Island, King Island, Leading Island, MacColl Island, and Observation Island.

Minto Anchorage is on the island's southwestern side and provides good anchorage in  gravel and clay.

References 

Islands of Hudson Strait
Islands of the Labrador Sea
Uninhabited islands of Qikiqtaaluk Region